William Cook was a professional player of English billiards in the 19th century. He won the World Championship on several occasions.

As this was the first actual match for the World Championship, the players themselves drew up a special set of rules for the game. Cook was nonetheless considered the favourite, and the 20-year-old had improved much from his win over Roberts Jr. the previous year. At 1:38 a.m. on the morning of 12 February 1870, Cook defeated Roberts 1,200-1,083 to win the title, and won a newly created trophy, £100 and a Maltese cross. The Prince of Wales attended the match at St. James's Hall. This match ended the dominance of Roberts Sr., as the wave of new players took over the game.

Roberts Sr. then retired, but Cook was to meet his match in the son, John Roberts Jr., who beat him 1,200-552 in a challenge match for the Championship in April 1870. Cook struggled to match Roberts in the matches, but after improving he was able to hold the championship until 1875. He was then beaten again by Roberts, who would go on to dominate billiards for the next thirty years.

Cook popularised the "spot-barred" version of English billiards, whereby the red could not be potted more than twice in succession from its spot. This helped to relieve monotonous play in billiards, and encourage spectators to watch the sport.

References

External links
William Cook biography at Billiards and Snooker Heritage.

English players of English billiards
1849 births
1893 deaths
Place of birth missing
Place of death missing
World champions in English billiards
People from Sandy, Bedfordshire